Corinth Township is one of twelve townships in Humboldt County, Iowa, USA. As of the 2000 census, its unincorporated population was 366. Corinth Township also contains most of the largest town in Humboldt County, Humboldt.

History
Corinth Township was organized in 1879.

Geography

Cities, towns, villages
 Humboldt

Adjacent townships
 Rutland Township (north)
 Grove Township (northeast)
 Beaver Township (east)
 Badger Township, Webster County (southeast)
 Deer Creek Township, Webster County (south)
 Jackson Township, Webster County (southwest)
 Weaver Township (west)
 Avery Township (northwest)

Cemeteries
The township contains Indian Mound Cemetery, Oakwood Cemetery, and Our Saviors Cemetery. St. Mary's Cemetery is located within the Humboldt city limits.

Political districts
 Iowa's 4th congressional district
 State House District 4

References
 United States Census Bureau 2008 TIGER/Line Shapefiles
 United States Board on Geographic Names (GNIS)
 United States National Atlas

External links
 

 US-Counties.com
 City-Data.com

Townships in Humboldt County, Iowa
Populated places established in 1876
Townships in Iowa
1876 establishments in Iowa